Thazi may refer to:

Mandalay Region, Burma
Thazi Township, in Meiktila District
Thazi, Meiktila, Mandalay Region, a town in Thazi Township

Sagaing Region, Burma
Thazi, Kale, a village in Kale Township
Thazi, Monywa, a community in Monywa Township
Thazi, Sagaing, a community in Sagaing Township
Thazi, Mingin, a village in Mingin Township

Bago Region, Burma
Thazi, Pyu, a community in Pyu Township